Salad Fingers is a British animated web series created by David Firth in 2004. It revolves around the eponymous Salad Fingers, a thin, green, mentally troubled man who inhabits a desolate world. As of March 2022, there have been twelve episodes published on YouTube and Newgrounds. Since its debut, Salad Fingers has amassed a cult following and has been described as a viral phenomenon.

Background
Salad Fingers was conceived as an in-joke when one day, while Firth was playing the guitar, his friend and frequent collaborator Christian Webb commented that he had "salad fingers", referring to the way Firth played the C-chord. In 2004, Firth posted the first episode via Flash to entertainment website Newgrounds, where it was initially unpopular. However, the video quickly gained traction once it was featured on the website's front page. Later, once the series transitioned to video-sharing platform YouTube, Firth turned to crowdfunding because he was unable to monetize videos due to the platform's content policy.

In addition to writing and animating the series, Firth voices the titular character himself. He claims to have based the character's cadence on a mixture of his grandmother's and Michael Jackson's voice. The softness of Salad Fingers's voice is due to the circumstance that Firth did not want to wake up his parents while recording. While the first episode took Firth "one day and one night" to produce, others took him six months and up to one year. He has cited the works of David Lynch, Tim Burton, and Chris Morris, as well as The League of Gentlemen and South Park as sources of inspiration. Music featured in Salad Fingers episodes includes work credited to Sigur Rós, Aphex Twin, and Boards of Canada.

In 2007, the series, then spanning seven episodes, had its theatrical debut at Sydney Underground Film Festival, where all episodes were shown back to back. In 2009, episodes were screened at Glimmer, Hull Daily Mails international short film festival. In 2020, a Salad Fingers tour throughout the United Kingdom was announced. The tour was postponed due to the COVID-19 pandemic and was ultimately held in 2021 and 2022. Events featured back-to-back screenings of all episodes released thus far, followed by an in-person interview with Firth.

Episodes

Reception
Salad Fingers has become the subject of a cult following and has generated a number of memes, having "captured the comically demented and strange underbelly of the internet" according to Elijah Watson of The Daily Dot. The series's characters, themes, and setting have inspired extensive discussions and theories online. In 2005, the San Francisco Chronicle ranked it among its "Top 10" pop culture phenomena. Wired considers Salad Fingers to be one of the most memorable Flash animations, and The Guardian describes it as one of the first to go "fully viral". In 2020, the series had been viewed 110 million times in total on YouTube, with the first episode alone receiving 36 million video views.

Jon Mendelsohn of Comic Book Resources observes that the series has "terrified audiences" by means of its "post-apocalyptic setting and crypticness" and compares it to the television series Twin Peaks. Tanner Fox of Screen Rant describes it as "nothing short of haunting" due to its "weird premises, nails-on-chalkboard background music, and shocking moments of gore and depravity". Devon Maloney of The Verge remarks its emphasis on gore and bodily fluids, calling it "basically ASMR for psychopaths". Will Ramsey of Hull Daily Mail calls it "comic, horrifying and strangely endearing". In reference to its impact online at the time of release, Emma Garland of Vice notes that the series caused both fascination and dread in its viewers, and deems it "one of the bleakest comedies to ever come out of the UK".

In 2019, a Canadian high school teacher was temporarily suspended after showing his class a range of videos that students described as "weird, creepy and inappropriate" including Salad Fingers. The teacher ultimately resigned from his job at the school and attended a disciplinary program. Firth commented on the situation on Twitter, declaring full support for the teacher showing the series.

See also
 Making Fiends
 Don't Hug Me I'm Scared 
 Marble Hornets

References

External links
 
 

2004 web series debuts
British animated web series
Flash animated web series
Animated characters
Internet memes
Viral videos